The Berrien Springs Grays were a minor league baseball team based in Berrien Springs, Michigan. In 1910, the Grays were charter members of the Class D level Indiana-Michigan League, winning the league championship in the league's only season of play. Berrien Springs hosted home minor league games at Grove City Park,

History
Berrien Springs, Michigan first hosted minor league baseball play in 1910, when the Berrien Springs Grays became charter members of the short–lived 1910 Class D level Indiana-Michigan League. Formed as a six–team league, the Indiana-Michigan League played games only on Sunday. The Dowagiac, Michigan team, Elkhart Blue Sox, Gary Sand Fleas, Ligonier, Indiana team and Niles Blues joined the Grays as charter members in league play.

The 1910 Berrien Springs Grays began play on May 8, 1910 and won the Indiana–Michigan League championship in a shortened season. After the Gary franchise folded on June 19, 1910 and Ligonier folded on June 30, 1910, the league continued play as a four-team league. The league then folded on August 21, 1910, with Berrien Springs in 1st place in the standings.

When the Indiana–Michigan League permanently folded on August 21, 1910, the Berrien Springs Grays were in 1st place with a 15–4 record, playing under manager G.O "Fatty" McComber. Berrien Springs finished 4.5 games ahead of 2nd place Elkhart in the final overall standings. The final Indiana–Michigan League overall standings were led by the Berrien Springs (15–4), followed by the Elkhart Blue Sox (10–8), Niles Blues (8–10) and Dowagiac (7–10). The Gary Sand Fleas had a record of 2–5 when they folded and Ligonier had a 2–6 final record in their brief period of play. The Indiana–Michigan League never reformed.

Berrien Springs, Michigan has not hosted another minor league team.

The ballpark
The Berrien Springs Grays were noted to have played 1910 minor league home games at the ballpark within Grove City Park. The ballpark was constructed in 1909. Also known as "Wolf's Prairie", the park was formed in 1881. Grove Park is still in use today as a public park. The park is located at the end of Main Street, Berrien Springs, Michigan.

Year–by–year record

Notable alumni
Player rosters and statistics for the 1910 Indiana-Michigan League teams, Berrien Springs included, are unknown.

References

External links
Baseball Reference

Defunct minor league baseball teams
Professional baseball teams in Michigan
Defunct baseball teams in Michigan
Baseball teams established in 1910
Baseball teams disestablished in 1910
Berrien County, Michigan